Clear Creek Township is a township in Vernon County, in the U.S. state of Missouri.

Clear Creek Township was erected in the 1860s, taking its name from Clear Creek.

References

Townships in Missouri
Townships in Vernon County, Missouri